Justice Warren may refer to:

Earl Warren (1891-1974), chief justice of the United States
Warren Burger, chief justice of the United States
Frederick A. Warren (1907-1995), associate justice of the South Dakota Supreme Court
Henry L. Warren (1837-1900), associate justice of the Territorial Montana Supreme Court